West Harbor is a food hall and waterfront park under construction in San Pedro, Los Angeles, California, facing Terminal Island and the Port of Los Angeles. The food hall will house five restaurants and 15 food stalls, as well as retail shops. West Harbor is being developed jointly by Ratkovich Company and Jerico Development. The developers have a 66-year lease with the port to build and operate the development. On November 11, 2022, it was announced that construction will begin immediately, and the project is expected to be finished in 2024.

References

External links 

 

Shopping malls in Los Angeles County, California
San Pedro, Los Angeles
Food halls

Food markets in the United States